Costebelle is a quarter of the town of Hyères in the southeast of France, in the Var département.

Geography of Var (department)